or , is a Japanese light novel series written by Yuu Tanaka and illustrated by Llo. It started as a web novel on the Shōsetsuka ni Narō website in October 2015. It was later published as a light novel by Micro Magazine, who released the first volume in July 2016. The series has received a manga adaptation by Tomowo Maruyama, published by Gentosha, as well as a spin-off manga by Hinako Inoue, published by Micro Magazine. Both the light novels and manga were licensed for North American release by Seven Seas Entertainment, as well as the spin-off. An anime television series adaptation by C2C aired from October to December 2022. A second season has been announced.

Plot
After dying in a car accident, the protagonist finds himself reincarnated in another world as a sword with no recollection of his name, though he remembers everything else from his previous life. Accepting his fate as a sword, he begins to seek someone to become his wielder, fighting and gaining powers. He discovers a caravan of slave traders under attack by a two-headed bear. A young catgirl slave, Fran, discovers the sword, and uses him to kill the bear. After being freed from slavery, she names the sword "Teacher", and the two embark on an adventure together.

Characters

Originally a human in his past life, Teacher finds himself reincarnated as a powerful, legendary sword. However, being forced in place, he resigns himself to rest until a mighty warrior can find and wield him. 

A young Black Cat-girl child, her parents were killed when she was young and was subsequently sold into slavery. However, when her caravan is attacked by a two-headed bear, she comes across and draws Teacher from his resting place. Together, the two embark on a quest to help Fran evolve fully, a feat no Black Cat has been able to achieve.

A half-elf who runs an orphanage. She has great admiration for Fran whom it is revealed she herself had looked after since her parents had died. 

A Wood Elf elementalist who is the guild master of the Alessa Adventurers' Guild. He is suspicious about the source of Fran's abilities, but allows her to join the guild. 

An Oni warrior who acts as examiner for the Adventurers' Guild, challenging prospective adventurers to duels to test their skills. He is defeated by Fran and allows her to pass the exam. 

The receptionist for the Alessa town Adventurers' Guild. She possesses a hidden dark side wishing death on adventurers she dislikes, but quickly warms up to Fran. 

An old dwarf with a passion for blacksmithing. He supplies Fran with all sorts of equipment and knows about Teacher.

Media

Light novel
Yuu Tanaka started the series as a web novel hosted on Shōsetsuka ni Narō in October 2015. Micro Magazine acquired and published the light novel series under their GC Novels imprint, with illustrations by Llo. Fourteen volumes have been published as of September 2022. The fifth volume's limited edition was bundled with a drama CD, telling an original story. Seven Seas Entertainment announced their acquisition of the light novels, and began releasing from August 6, 2019.

Manga
A manga adaptation by Tomowo Maruyamawa was serialized in Gentosha's Denshi Birz magazine from December 9, 2016 to January 15, 2018. After the magazine stopped, it resumed publishing on Comic Boost. The series is compiled into twelve tankōbon volumes, with the first volume released in April 2017. Seven Seas Entertainment also licensed the manga for North American release, with the first volume releasing on December 17, 2019. A spin-off manga written by Tanaka and illustrated by Hinako Inoue began serialization in Micro Magazine's Comic Ride website on June 1, 2020. The spin-off manga will end with the release of its sixth volume on March 31, 2023. The spin-off manga is also licensed by Seven Seas.

Another Wish

Anime
An anime television series adaptation was announced on the twelfth volume of the light novel on September 24, 2021. The series is produced by C2C and directed by Shinji Ishihira, with Takahiro Nagano writing and supervising the scripts, Atsuki Saitō designing the characters and serving as chief animation director, and Yasuharu Takanashi composing the music. It aired from October 5 to December 21, 2022, on Tokyo MX, ABC, and BS Asahi. The opening theme song is "Tensei Shitara Ken Deshita" by Kishida Kyoudan & The Akeboshi Rockets, while the ending theme song is "More Strongly" by Maon Kurosaki. At Anime Expo 2022, Sentai Filmworks announced that they licensed the series outside of Asia. This was followed by an English dub as announced at Anime Weekend Atlanta on October 28, 2022.

After the airing of the final episode, a second season was announced.

Episode list

Season One (2022)

Reception
Theron Martin of Anime News Network, in his review of the first volume of the light novel, praised the interactions between the two lead characters, and said: "Beyond the action scenes, Tanaka's writing skill is a little above average. Dialogue and character development flows smoothly and world-building, though somewhat limited, does fit with the perspective of the central characters." However, he criticized the story's lack of originality, noting its similarities to So I'm a Spider, So What?, That Time I Got Reincarnated as a Slime, and Reborn as a Vending Machine, I Now Wander the Dungeon.

See also
 Mushi-Uta, another light novel series illustrated by the same illustrator
 Oreshura, another light novel series illustrated by the same illustrator
 Unbreakable Machine-Doll, another light novel series illustrated by the same illustrator

Notes

References

External links
  at Shōsetsuka ni Narō 
  
  
  
  
 

2016 Japanese novels
Anime and manga based on light novels
C2C (studio)
Fiction about reincarnation
Gentosha manga
Isekai anime and manga
Isekai novels and light novels
Japanese webcomics
Kemonomimi
Light novels
Light novels first published online
Medialink
Seinen manga
Sentai Filmworks
Seven Seas Entertainment titles
Shōsetsuka ni Narō
Upcoming anime television series
Webcomics in print